Titan most often refers to:

 Titan (moon), the largest moon of Saturn
 Titans, a race of deities in Greek mythology

Titan or Titans may also refer to:

Arts and entertainment

Fictional entities

Fictional locations
 Titan in fiction, fictionalized depictions of the moon of Saturn
 Titan (Marvel Comics location), a moon
 Titan (Marvel Cinematic Universe), its Marvel Cinematic Universe counterpart
 Titan, a moon in the list of locations of the DC Universe
 Titan, a Fighting Fantasy gamebooks world

Fictional characters
 Titan (Dark Horse Comics), a superhero
 Titan (Imperial Guard), a Marvel Comics superhero
 Titan (New Gods), from DC Comics' Darkseid's Elite
 Titan, in the Infershia Pantheon
 Titan, in Megamind
 Titan, in Sym-Bionic Titan
 King Titan, on Stingray (1964 TV series)

Fictional species and groups
 Titan (Dune)
 Titan (Dungeons & Dragons)
 Teen Titans, a DC superhero team
 Titan Legions, units in the tabletop game Epic
 Titans, in All Tomorrows
 Titans, in Attack on Titan (manga series)
 Titans, in Brütal Legend
 Titans, in Destiny (video game)
 Titans, in Godzilla: King of the Monsters (2019 film)
 Titans, in the Marvel Universe, the fictional race of supervillain Thanos
 Titans, in Mobile Suit Zeta Gundam
 Titans, in Titanfall

Other fictional entities
 Titan, a chemical in Batman: Arkham Asylum
 Titan, a class of ship in Eve Online
 Titan, a ship in the 1898 novel The Wreck of the Titan: Or, Futility noted for similarities to the Titanic
 Titan Off-Planet Construction, in the video games DOOM (2016) and DOOM Eternal

Film and television

 The Titan (film), a 2018 science fiction film directed by Lennart Ruff
 The Titan: Story of Michelangelo, a 1950 German documentary film
 Titan A.E., a 2000 animated film
 Titans (2000 TV series), a 2000 American soap opera
 Titans (2018 TV series), a 2018 live-action superhero series
 Titans (Canadian TV series), a 1981–1982 docudrama series

Games

 Titan (1988 video game), a puzzle game by Titus
 Titan (Battlefield 2142)
 Titan (Blizzard Entertainment project), a cancelled massive multiplayer game
 Titan (board game), a board game
 Titan (eSports), an electronic sports team
 Titan (game engine)
 Age of Mythology: The Titans, an expansion pack for the Age of Mythology computer game
 Planetary Annihilation: Titans, an expansion pack RTS

Literature

 Titan (Baxter novel), a 1997 science fiction novel by Stephen Baxter
 Titan (Bova novel), a novel by Ben Bova in the Grand Tour series
 Titan (Jean Paul novel), a novel by the German writer Jean Paul
 Titan (John Varley novel), a 1979 novel in the Gaea Trilogy
 Titan (Fighting Fantasy book), a 1986 fantasy encyclopedia edited by Marc Gascoigne
 Star Trek: Titan, a novel series
 The Game-Players of Titan, a 1963 science fiction novel by Philip K. Dick
 The Sirens of Titan, a 1959 science fiction novel by Kurt Vonnegut, Jr.
 The Titan (collection), a collection of short stories by P. Schuyler Miller
 The Titan (novel), a 1914 novel by Theodore Dreiser
 The Titans (comic book) (1999–2003), published by DC Comics, featuring the Teen Titans superhero team
 The Titans (novel), a novel in the Kent Family Chronicles series by John Jakes

Music
 Titán (band), a Mexican band
 Tytan (band), a British rock band
 Titan (album), a 2014 album by Septicflesh
 Symphony No. 1 (Mahler), given the working title Titan
 "Titan", by HammerFall from the album Threshold
 "Titan", by the American band Bright from the album The Albatross Guest House
 The Titan (EP), by Oh, Sleeper
"Titans", by Major Lazer featuring Sia and Labrinth from the album Music Is the Weapon (Reloaded)

Roller coasters
 Titan (Six Flags Over Texas), a steel hyper coaster at Six Flags Over Texas, Arlington, Texas, US
 Titan (Space World), a steel roller coaster at Space World, Kitakyushu, Japan

Brands and enterprises

Entertainment and media companies
 Titan (transit advertising company), an American advertising company
 Titan Corporation, a United States-based information technology company
 Titan Entertainment Group, a British media company that includes Titan Books and Titan Comics
 Titan Media, a pornographic film company
 Titan Studios, a video game company

Manufacturers
 Titan Aircraft, an aircraft kit manufacturer
 Titan Cement, a Greek building materials company
 Titan Chemical Corp, a Malaysian chemical company
 Titan Company, an Indian watchmaking and luxury goods company
 Titan Formula Cars, a race car manufacturer from 1967-1976
 Titan Tire Corporation

Other brands and enterprises
 Titan, a hockey equipment brand by The Hockey Company
 Titan, a line of locks by Kwikset
 Titan Airways, an airline
 Titan Advisors, an American asset management firm
 TITAN Salvage, a marine salvage and wreck removal company

People
 Titán (wrestler) (born 1990), Mexican masked wrestler
 Titan, gladiator from the 2008 TV series American Gladiators
 Oliver Kahn (born 1969), German footballer known as Der Titan

Places
 Titan (cave), Derbyshire, England
 Titan, Saghar District, Afghanistan
 Titan, Bucharest, a neighborhood of Bucharest, Romania
 Titan metro station
 Titan, Russia, a rural locality in Murmansk Oblast, Russia
 Titan Tower (Fisher Towers), a natural tower in Utah, US
 Titan Stadium (disambiguation), name of a number of stadiums

Science and technology

Computing

Smartphones
 HTC Titan (Windows Mobile phone), a smartphone running the Windows Mobile operating system
 HTC Titan, a smartphone running the Windows Phone operating system
 HTC TyTN, a smartphone
 Moto G (2nd generation), a Motorola smartphone with the codename Titan running the Android operating system

Other uses in computing
 Titan (1963 computer), a 1960s British computer
 Titan (game engine)
 Titan (microprocessor), a scrapped family of 32-bit PowerPC-based microprocessor cores
 Titan (supercomputer), an American supercomputer
 Titan, a Facebook messaging platform
 GTX Titan, a GPU by NVIDIA
 TITAN2D, a geoflow simulation software application
 Titan (security token), a security chip and key from Google

Cranes
 Herman the German (crane vessel), former nickname for the floating crane Titan in the Panama Canal Zone
 Australian floating crane Titan
 Titan crane, a type of block setting crane
 Titan Clydebank, a cantilever crane in Scotland

Natural sciences
 Titan (moon), the largest moon of Saturn
 "-titan", a commonly used taxonomic suffix to describe large animals
 Titan beetle
 Titan test, an intelligence test

Other technologies
 Tactical Intelligence Targeting Access Node (TITAN), a US Army program

Sports

Sports teams

 Acadie–Bathurst Titan, a Canadian ice hockey team
 Dresden Titans, a German basketball team
 Gold Coast Titans, an Australian rugby league team
 Kotka Titans, a Finnish ice hockey team
 New York Titans (lacrosse), a 2006–2009 American lacrosse team
 Orlando Titans, a 2010 American lacrosse team
 Taunton Titans, first XV team of Taunton Rugby Football Club 
 Tennessee Titans, an American football team
 Titanes F.C., a Venezuelan football team
 Titanes de Barranquilla, a Colombian basketball team
 Titans (cricket team), a South African cricket team
 Titans of New York, an American football team
 Titans RLFC, a Welsh rugby league team
 Ulster Titans, a Northern Irish rugby team
 Victoria Titans, an Australian basketball team

Championships
 Titan Cup, a triangular cricket series between India, South Africa and Australia in 1996

Vehicles

Air- and spacecraft
 Titan (rocket family)
 Titan I
 Titan II
 Airfer Titan, a Spanish paramotor design
 Cessna 404 Titan, a light aircraft
 Ellipse Titan, a hang glider
 Pro-Design Titan, an Austrian paraglider design
 Titan Tornado, a family of cantilever high-wing, pusher configuration, tricycle gear-equipped kit aircraft manufactured by Titan Aircraft

Land vehicles
 Apple electric car project, codenamed Titan
 Chevrolet Titan, a cabover truck made 1968–1988
 Leyland Titan (B15), a bus made 1977–1984
 Leyland Titan (front-engined double-decker), a bus chassis made 1927–1969
 Mazda Titan, a cabover truck sold in Japan
 Nissan Titan, a pickup truck made 2003–present
 Terex 33-19 "Titan", a haul truck
 Volkswagen Titan, a truck in the Volkswagen Constellation line sold in Brazil

Maritime vessels
 Titan (steam tug 1894), a Dutch steam tug
 Titan (yacht), a 2010 Abeking & Rasmussen built yacht
 Australian floating crane Titan
 Empire Titan, a tugboat
 USNS Titan (T-AGOS-15), a 1988 U.S. Navy ship
 Titan, a floating crane in the Panama Canal Zone long known as Herman the German

Rail
 Titan, a South Devon Railway Gorgon class locomotive

Other uses
 Titan test, an intelligence test
 Titan (dog), the world's tallest dog
 Titan (prison), a proposed new classification of prison in England and Wales
 Titan, a type of banknote of the pound sterling
 Titan language, a language of Manus Island, Papua New Guinea
 Titan the Robot, a costume
 HMH-769, a helicopter squadron, nicknamed Titan
 Grand Titan, a high-ranking title in the white supremacist Ku Klux Klan

See also

 The Titan Games, an American television series
 Game Titan, a former American Video Game development studio
 Remember the Titans, a 2000 American sports drama film
 
 
 
 Project Titan (disambiguation)
 Teen Titans (disambiguation)
 Titanic (disambiguation)
 Titanium (disambiguation)
 Titian (disambiguation)
 Titin, a protein